Harry Cunningham may refer to:
 Harry B. Cunningham (1907–1992), American businessman
 Harry Cunningham (activist) (1891–1938), Irish-American activist
 Harry Cunningham (baseball), Negro league baseball player
 Harry Cunningham (footballer) (born 1993), Australian Rules footballer
 Peerie Cunningham (Henry/Harry Cunningham, 1898–1972), Scottish footballer for Ayr United and Kilmarnock
 Harry Cunningham, a principal character in the Silent Witness British television series

See also
 Henry Cunningham (c. 1678–1736), Scottish politician
 Henry Cunningham (knight), Scottish noble
 H. S. Cunningham (Henry Stewart Cunningham, 1832–1920), British lawyer and writer